Verujem ti jer smo isti (Very Similar Indeed We are So I Believe You) is the third studio album by the Serbian indie/alternative rock band Obojeni Program released by the Serbian independent record label Metropolis Records in 1994.

Track listing 
All music and lyrics by Obojeni Program.

Personnel 
The band
 Branislav Babić "Kebra" — vocals
 Danica Milovanov "Daca" — vocals, backing vocals
 Jovanka Ilić — vocals, backing vocals
 Dragan Knežević — guitar, backing vocals
 Vladimir Cinkocki "Cina" — drums
 Ljubomir Pejić "Ljuba" — bass guitar

Additional personnel
 Miroslav Mandić — recitation on track 6
 Dragan Džolić — executive producer
 Jan Šaš — recorded by
 Vlada Žeželj — sampler

References 

 Verujem ti jer smo isti at Discogs
 EX YU ROCK enciklopedija 1960-2006, Janjatović Petar; 
 NS rockopedija, novosadska rock scena 1963-2003, Mijatović Bogomir, SWITCH, 2005

Obojeni Program albums
1994 albums